Potrok Aike is a maar in the Patagonian province of Santa Cruz, Argentina. It has a roughly circular shape and an average diameter of 2,700 metres. It is located just 2,200 metres north of the Argentina-Chile border. It is a maar lake and part of the Pali-Aike Volcanic Field. The Potrok Aike Maar Lake Sediment Archive Drilling Project (PASADO) bore a number of ICDP drill holes for October–November 2008. The aim is to investigate the crater-filling sediments and the underlying volcaniclastic deposits.

Climate

Notes 

Lakes of Santa Cruz Province, Argentina
Maars of Argentina
Volcanoes of Santa Cruz Province, Argentina